WAST was a commercial daytime-only radio station licensed to Ashtabula, Ohio at 1600 AM, serving parts of Northeast Ohio and Northwest Pennsylvania. The station broadcast from 1964 to 1982 with the WAQI callsign.

History

WAQI
What ended up becoming WAST first went on the air on February 6, 1964, as WAQI, founded by James B. Denton in the late 1950s.  Denton applied for the permit in December 1959.  The FCC granted the construction permit in April 1962.

The station broadcast at 1,000 watts during daytime hours only using a two-tower directional antenna with majority of the signal going east and west, from its studio and transmitter facility at the intersection of North Bend Road and Ketchum Avenue in Ashtabula.  WAQI fell silent on October 1, 1982, when the FCC license expired.

WAST
Although 1600 never returned to the air, it was licensed again on May 21, 1984, under the call sign WAST The license for WAST expired on June 7, 1991, and has since been deleted by the FCC. FCC rules now prohibit the re-licensing of daytime stations, so the station is gone forever. The original transmitter/studio building and the north tower still stand on North Bend Road in Ashtabula.

Photos

References

External links
FCC History Cards for WAST (AM) (1964-1980)

1964 establishments in Ohio
Defunct radio stations in the United States
Radio stations established in 1964
AST
1982 disestablishments in Ohio
Radio stations disestablished in 1982
AST